Kolia is a town in northern Ivory Coast. It is a sub-prefecture and commune of Kouto Department in Bagoué Region, Savanes District.

In 2021, the population of the sub-prefecture of Kolia was 32,113.

Villages
The 10 villages of the sub-prefecture of Kolia and their population in 2014 are :

Notes

Sub-prefectures of Bagoué
Communes of Bagoué